Mamadou Diakité (born 1950, in Bamako) is the Minister of Youth, Work, Employment and Professional Development of Mali since 24 April 2012.

References

Government ministers of Mali
Living people
People from Bamako
1950 births
21st-century Malian people